Tegeticula rostratella is a moth of the family Prodoxidae. It is found in the Big Bend region of the United States, south to the Mapimí region in southern Coahuila in Mexico. The habitat consists of scrub desert.

The wingspan is 18.5–26 mm. The forewings are white and the hindwings are white or sometimes light gray.

The larvae feed on Yucca rostrata and Yucca rigida. They feed on developing seeds. Pupation takes place in a cocoon in the soil.

References

Moths described in 1999
Prodoxidae